Route 132  is the longest highway in Quebec. It follows the south shore of the Saint Lawrence River from the border with the state of New York in the hamlet of Dundee (connecting with New York State Route 37 (NY 37) via NY 970T, an unsigned reference route, north of Massena), west of Montreal to the Gulf of Saint Lawrence and circles the Gaspé Peninsula. This highway is known as the Navigator's Route. It passes through the Montérégie, Centre-du-Québec, Chaudière-Appalaches, Bas-Saint-Laurent and Gaspésie regions of the province.

Unlike the more direct Autoroute 20, which it shadows from Longueuil to Sainte-Luce, Route 132 takes a more scenic route which goes through many historic small towns. Until the connection between Rivière-du-Loup and Rimouski is completed, this highway provides a link between the two sections of Autoroute 20. At Rivière-du-Loup, the Trans-Canada Highway continues south on Autoroute 85 to Edmundston, New Brunswick. This eastern section of the highway, from Rivière-du-Loup towards Gaspé, was the former Route 6, until the early 1970s realignment of route numbers into a grid.

At Sainte-Flavie, the highway splits and one branch turns south following the valley of the Matapédia River to reach the New Brunswick border near Campbellton, joining New Brunswick Route 11, a major highway along that province's eastern coast. The other branch continues east to follow the coast of the Gaspé peninsula and eventually rejoin the other branch at Matapédia. The total length of this loop is over 930 km.

Between Candiac and Varennes, the highway overlaps various current and former Quebec Autoroutes and can be considered a continuous autoroute by itself, as it runs along the Saint Lawrence River through most of this section. Highway 132 joins Autoroute 15 in Candiac at its Exit 42 and overlaps it until Exit 53 (on the other side Exit 75 of Autoroute 20), in Brossard, where Autoroute 15 separates onto Champlain Bridge. There, Highway 132 begins its overlap with Autoroute 20 until Boucherville, where Autoroute 20 splits off onto Autoroute Jean-Lesage. From that point, Highway 132 continues to the east of Boucherville as a four-lane expressway formerly known as Autoroute 430 and downgrades to a two-lane highway in Varennes.

Municipalities along Route 132

 Dundee
 Saint-Anicet
 Sainte-Barbe
 Saint-Stanislas-de-Kostka
 Salaberry-de-Valleyfield
 Beauharnois
 Léry
 Châteauguay
 Kahnawake
 Sainte-Catherine
 Saint-Constant
 Delson
 Candiac
 La Prairie
 Brossard
 Saint-Lambert
 Longueuil
 Boucherville
 Varennes
 Verchères
 Contrecoeur
 Sorel-Tracy
 Saint-Robert
 Yamaska
 Saint-Gerard-Majella
 Saint-François-du-Lac
 Pierreville
 Odanak
 Baie-du-Febvre
 Nicolet
 Bécancour
 Saint-Pierre-les-Becquets
 Deschaillons-sur-Saint-Laurent
 Leclercville
 Lotbinière
 Sainte-Croix
 Saint-Antoine-de-Tilly
 Lévis
 Beaumont
 Saint-Michel-de-Bellechasse
 Saint-Vallier
 Berthier-sur-Mer
 Montmagny
 Cap-Saint-Ignace
 L'Islet
 Saint-Jean-Port-Joli
 Saint-Roch-des-Aulnaies
 Sainte-Anne-de-La-Pocatière
 La Pocatière
 Rivière-Ouelle
 Saint-Denis-De La Bouteillerie
 Kamouraska
 Saint-Germain-de-Kamouraska
 Saint-André-de-Kamouraska
 Notre-Dame-du-Portage
 Rivière-du-Loup
 Cacouna
 L'Isle-Verte
 Notre-Dame-des-Neiges
 Trois-Pistoles
 Saint-Simon-de-Rimouski
 Saint-Fabien
 Rimouski
 Sainte-Luce
 Sainte-Flavie (Route 132 splits at this point,  heading east and south to complete a loop)

 Grand-Métis
 Métis-sur-Mer
 Baie-des-Sables
 Saint-Ulric
 Matane
 Sainte-Felicité
 Grosses-Roches
 Les Méchins
 Cap-Chat
 Sainte-Anne-des-Monts
 La Martre
 Marsoui
 Rivière-à-Claude
 Mont-Saint-Pierre
 Saint-Maxime-du-Mont-Louis
 Sainte-Madeleine-de-la-Rivière-Madeleine
 Grande-Vallée
 Petite-Vallée
 Cloridorme
 Rivière-Saint-Jean
 Gaspé
 Percé
 Sainte-Thérèse-de-Gaspé
 Grande-Rivière
 Chandler
 Port-Daniel–Gascons
 Shigawake
 Saint-Godefroi
 Hope Town
 Hope
 Paspébiac
 New Carlisle
 Bonaventure
 Saint-Siméon
 Caplan
 New Richmond
 Cascapédia–Saint-Jules
 Gesgapegiag
 Maria
 Carleton-sur-Mer
 Nouvelle
 Escuminac
 Pointe-à-la-Croix
 Listuguj
 Ristigouche-Partie-Sud-Est
 Matapédia
 Saint-André-de-Restigouche
 Routhierville
 Sainte-Florence
 Causapscal
 Lac-au-Saumon
 Amqui
 Val-Brillant
 Sayabec
 Saint-Moise
 Sainte-Jeanne-d'Arc
 Sainte-Angele-de-Merici
 Saint-Joseph-de-Lepage
 Mont-Joli
 Sainte-Flavie

See also
 List of Quebec provincial highways
 Heritage Highway
 Route 132, a 2010 crime film set on Route 132

References

External links 

 Provincial Route Map (Courtesy of the Quebec Ministry of Transportation) 

132
Roads in Longueuil
Transport in Boucherville
Transport in Brossard
Transport in Gaspé, Quebec
Transport in Lévis, Quebec
Transport in Rivière-du-Loup
Transport in Saint-Lambert, Quebec
Transport in Sorel-Tracy
Carleton-sur-Mer